Penda Ly (born in 1991)  is Senegal beauty pageant titleholder who was crowned Miss Senegal 2012.

Miss Senegal
Penda Ly, a 21-year-old student of marketing from Dakar, was crowned Miss Senegal 2012 during an event held at the King Pahd Palace.

References

1991 births
People from Dakar
Living people